There have been Chinese alphabets, that are pre-existing alphabets adapted to write down the Chinese language. However, the standard Chinese writing system uses a non-alphabetic script with an alphabet for supplementary use. There is no original alphabet native to China. China has its Pinyin system though sometimes the term is used anyway to refer to logographic Chinese characters (sinograms). It is more appropriately used, though, for phonemic transcriptions such as pinyin. However, there were attempts to replace the whole Chinese script with alphabets but failed in the end, so the Chinese characters were kept. Simplified Chinese characters replaced Traditional Chinese characters, which the original form is still used today in  Hong Kong, Taiwan, and Macau. Simplified Chinese is used in mainland China and Singapore.

Alphabetic transcription of Chinese
For the use of the Latin alphabet to transcribe Chinese, see:
 Romanization of Chinese in Taiwan
 Hanyu Pinyin (a.k.a. Pinyin) – the modern international standard for transcription of Standard Chinese
 Wade–Giles
 Yale romanization of Mandarin
For the use of Cyrillic script to transcribe Chinese, see:
 Cyrillization of Chinese

For the use of the Arabic alphabet to transcribe Chinese, see:
 Xiao'erjing

For another phonetic script in widespread use in Taiwan (often called an alphabet but actually a semi-syllabary) see:
 Zhuyin fuhao (a.k.a. bopomofo or Zhuyin)

Under the Yuan Dynasty (1271–1368), an alphabetic script called 'Phags-pa was used to write Late Middle Chinese (as well as Tibetan and Mongolian).
See also Other: Arabic Chinese Alphabet

See also
 Chinese character classification
 Fanqie
 Transliteration into Chinese characters

References

Transcription of Chinese

To translate Chinese, see:
Cyrillization of Chinese